The 1980 Avon Championships of Los Angeles was a women's tennis tournament played on indoor carpet courts at the Forum in Los Angeles, California in the United States that was part of the 1980 Avon Championships circuit. It was the seventh edition of the tournament and was held from February 4 through February 10, 1980. First-seeded Martina Navratilova won the singles title and earned $24,000 first-prize money.

Finals

Singles
 Martina Navratilova defeated  Tracy Austin 6–2, 6–0
 It was Navratilova's 4th singles title of the year and the 38th of her career.

Doubles
 Rosie Casals /  Martina Navratilova defeated  Kathy Jordan /  Anne Smith 7–6, 6–2

Prize money

References

External links
 Women's Tennis Association (WTA) tournament edition details
 International Tennis Federation (ITF) tournament edition details

Avon Championships of Los Angeles
LA Women's Tennis Championships
Avon Championships of Los Angeles
Avon Championships of Los Angeles
Avon Championships of Los Angeles
Avon Championships of Los Angeles